Cativolcus or Catuvolcus (died 53 BC) was king of half of the country of the Eburones, a people between the Meuse and Rhine rivers, united with Ambiorix, the other king, in the insurrection against the Romans in 54 BC; but when Julius Caesar in the next year proceeded to devastate the territories of the Eburones, Cativolcus, who was advanced in age and unable to endure the labours of war and flight, poisoned himself with a yew, after imprecating curses upon Ambiorix.

Name 
The Gaulish personal name Catu-uolcos ('war-falcon, battle-hawk') is a compound formed with the stem catu- ('battle') attached to uolcos ('falcon, hawk'). The Eburonian name has an exact parallel in the Middle Welsh cadwalch ('hero, champion, warrior'), both stemming from a Proto-Celtic form *katuwolkos. It is cognate with the Gaulish ethnonym Volcae.

References

Bibliography 

 

53 BC deaths
Barbarian people of the Gallic Wars
Belgae
Celtic warriors
Gaulish rulers
Germanic rulers
Germanic warriors
Year of birth unknown